Hellesøy Verft is a small shipyard in Kvinnherad, Norway.

External links 
Official website

Shipyards of Norway
Kvinnherad
Companies based in Hordaland